Helena Fromm (born 5 August 1987 in Oeventrop, Nordrhein-Westfalen, West Germany) is a German taekwondo athlete. Representing Germany at the 2007 World Taekwondo Championships in Beijing, China, she won the bronze medal in the welterweight (–67 kg) division. In 2008, she participated in the European Taekwondo Championships in Rome, Italy, and won the gold medal in the welterweight division, winning over Gwladys Épangue of France in the final.

Fromm represented her country in the –67 kg class at the 2008 Beijing Olympics. Winning her first fight 6–1, before losing to Asunción Ocasio of Puerto Rico by points.

She won the bronze medal at the 2012 Summer Olympics in the women's 67 kg category.

External links
 
 
 
 

1987 births
German female taekwondo practitioners
Living people
Olympic bronze medalists for Germany
Olympic medalists in taekwondo
Olympic taekwondo practitioners of Germany
Taekwondo practitioners at the 2008 Summer Olympics
Taekwondo practitioners at the 2012 Summer Olympics
Medalists at the 2012 Summer Olympics
European Taekwondo Championships medalists
World Taekwondo Championships medalists
Sportspeople from Arnsberg (region)
People from Arnsberg